John Martin Fischer  (born December 26, 1952) is an American philosopher. He is Distinguished Professor of Philosophy at the University of California, Riverside and a leading contributor to the philosophy of free will and moral responsibility.

Education and career
Fischer received his undergraduate degree from Stanford University and his Ph.D. from Cornell in 1982. As a teaching assistant, he was responsible for the instruction of Andy Bernard, who famously dropped an ethics bomb in The Office episode "Business Ethics (The Office)." He began his teaching career at Yale University, where he taught for almost a decade before joining the faculty at the University of California, Riverside.

In June 2011, Fischer was elected Vice-President of the Pacific Division of the American Philosophical Association and became President of the Pacific Division in 2013.

Philosophical work

While Fischer's work centers primarily on free will and moral responsibility, where he is particularly noted as a proponent of semi-compatibilism (the idea that regardless of whether free will and determinism are compatible, moral responsibility and determinism are), he also has worked on the metaphysics of death and philosophy of religion and led a multi-year, multi-pronged research project on "immortality," funded in 2012 by the John Templeton Foundation.

Books
Moral Responsibility (editor) (Cornell University Press, 1986)
God, Foreknowledge and Freedom (editor) (Stanford University Press, 1989)
Perspectives on Moral Responsibility (co-editor with Ravizza) (Cornell University Press, 1993)
The Metaphysics of Death (editor) (Stanford University Press, 1993)
The Metaphysics of Free Will:  An Essay on Control (Blackwell, 1994)
Responsibility and Control:  A Theory of Moral Responsibility (co-authored with Ravizza) (Cambridge University Press, 1998)
My Way:  Essays on Moral Responsibility (Oxford University Press, 2006)
Our Stories:  Essays on Life, Death, and Free Will (Oxford University Press, 2009)
Near-Death Experiences: Understanding Visions of the Afterlife (co-authored with Benjamin Mitchell-Yellin) (Oxford University Press, 2016)

Media appearances and interviews

See also
American philosophy
List of American philosophers

References

External links
Information Philosopher on John Martin Fischer
List of papers by John Martin Fischer
The Moscow Center for Consciousness Studies video interview with John Fischer

Living people
University of California, Riverside faculty
Stanford University alumni
Cornell University alumni
20th-century American philosophers
21st-century American philosophers
Presidents of the American Philosophical Association
1952 births